1792 in sports describes the year's events in world sport.

Boxing
Events
 "Big Ben" Brain retained his English Championship title but he became ill with cirrhosis of the liver and did not fight again. He died of the disease in April 1794.

Cricket
Events
 During a minor match in Sheffield, the first known instance is recorded of a batsman being given out for obstructing the field. John Shaw, who had scored 7, has his dismissal recorded as "run out of the ground to hinder a catch".
England
 Most runs – Tom Walker 542 (HS 107)
 Most wickets – Thomas Boxall 46

Horse racing
England
 The Derby – John Bull
 The Oaks – Volante
 St Leger Stakes – Tartar

References

 
1792